Martin Johansson (born 4 December 1964) is a Swedish orienteering competitor who competed in the 1990s. He earned a bronze medal in the short distance at the 1991 World Orienteering Championships.  He finished 2nd overall in the Orienteering World Cup in 1992,  and won a bronze medal in the short distance at the 1993 World Championships.

References

1964 births
Living people
Swedish orienteers
Male orienteers
Foot orienteers
World Orienteering Championships medalists